Wayne Julies (born 23 October 1978 in Paarl) is a South African rugby union footballer. He has played for the national team, the Springboks nine times. He made his debut for South Africa at the 1999 Rugby World Cup, in a match against Spain. His usual position is as a centre.

Julies played for the Bulls in the 2007 Super 14 season. Also in the Super 12/14, he has been with the Cats and the Stormers. He was also part of South Africa's victorious 2007 Rugby World Cup squad, having been called in as an injury replacement for Jean de Villiers, who tore a bicep during the pool stages. He moved to France in 2009 to play for Pays d'Aix RC.

In the 2011 season Wayne Julies began to play for a Premier League B Rugby team from the Sir Lowries Pass area called Sir Lowrians where he played outside center. He also took on coaching duties for the club.

References

External links

 SA Rugby

1978 births
Living people
Sportspeople from Paarl
Cape Coloureds
Rugby union centres
South African rugby union coaches
South African rugby union players
South Africa international rugby union players
Bulls (rugby union) players
Blue Bulls players
Golden Lions players
Lions (United Rugby Championship) players
Stormers players
Free State Cheetahs players
South African expatriate rugby union players
Expatriate rugby union players in France
South African expatriate sportspeople in France
Rugby union players from the Western Cape